Som Alternativa is a political movement in Catalonia founded by former Podemos/Podem regional leader Albano Dante Fachin as a political platform in November 2017. It was registered as a party on 25 February 2019. The party contested the April 2019 Spanish general election within the Republican Front alliance with Poble Lliure and Pirates of Catalonia.

References

Political parties in Catalonia
Political parties established in 2017
2017 establishments in Catalonia